Panic buying (alternatively hyphenated as panic-buying; also known as panic purchasing) occurs when consumers buy unusually large amounts of a product in anticipation of, or after, a disaster or perceived disaster, or in anticipation of a large price increase, or shortage.

Panic buying during health crises is influenced by "(1) individuals' perception of the threat of a health crisis and scarcity of products; (2) fear of the unknown, which is caused by emotional pressure and uncertainty; (3) coping behaviour, which views panic buying as a venue to relieve anxiety and regain control over the crisis; and (4) social psychological factors, which account for the influence of the social network of an individual".

Panic buying is a type of herd behavior. It is of interest in consumer behavior theory, the broad field of economic study dealing with explanations for "collective action such as fads and fashions, stock market movements, runs on nondurable goods, buying sprees, hoarding, and banking panics".

Panic buying can lead to genuine shortages regardless of whether the risk of a shortage is real or perceived; the latter scenario is an example of self-fulfilling prophecy.

Examples
Panic buying occurred before, during, or following:
 The First and Second World Wars.
 The 1918–1919 global influenza pandemic ("Spanish flu") led to the panic buying of quinine and other remedies for influenza and its symptoms from pharmacists and doctors' surgeries. Sales of Vicks VapoRub increased from $900,000 to $2.9 million in a year.
 In the First Austrian Republic in 1922, hyperinflation and the rapid depreciation of the Austrian krone led to panic buying and food hoarding, which continued until a rescue backed by the League of Nations prevented an economic collapse.
 Bengal famine of 1943.
 1962 Cuban Missile Crisis led to panic buying of canned foods in the United States.
 The 1973 toilet paper panic in the United States.
 The 1979 oil crisis led to panic buying of oil, led by Japan.
 The 1985 arrival of New Coke led many consumers to panic buy the original Coke.
 Year 2000 problem – food.
 2001 – panic buying of metals, gold and oil on international commodity markets following the September 11 attacks.
 In January and February 2003, during the SARS outbreak, several rounds of panic buying of various products (including salt, rice, vinegar, vegetable oil, antibiotics, masks, and traditional Chinese medicine) took place in the Chinese province of Guangdong and in neighboring areas such as Hainan and Hong Kong.
 2000 and 2005 UK fuel protests.
 2005 Jilin chemical plant explosions – water, food.
 2008–2016 United States ammunition shortage – panic buying by gun owners who feared tougher gun control laws under President Barack Obama was one cause of ammunition shortages.
 In September 2013 during the Venezuelan economic crisis, the Venezuelan government temporarily took over the Aragua-based Paper Manufacturing Company toilet paper plant to manage the "production, marketing and distribution" of toilet paper following months of depleted stocks of basic goods—including toilet paper—and foodstuffs, such as rice and cooking oil. Blame for the shortages was placed on "ill-conceived government policies such as price controls on basic goods and tight restrictions on foreign currency" and hoarding.
 Dakazo – Amid decreased support before the 2013 Venezuelan municipal elections, Venezuelan president Nicolás Maduro announced the military occupation of stores on 8 November 2013, proclaiming "Leave nothing on the shelves!" The announcement of lowered prices sparked looting in multiple cities across Venezuela. By the end of the Dakazo, many Venezuelan stores were left empty of their goods. A year later in November 2014, some stores still remained empty following the Dakazo.
 In September 2021, panic buying of petrol led to empty fuel filling stations across the United Kingdom. A lack of tanker drivers was blamed, with Brexit  being the primary cause according to most Road Haulage Association respondents.
In November 2021, panic buying of groceries took place in the British Columbia Interior and Fraser Valley owing to the impacts of the 2021 Pacific Northwest floods.
 On March 3, 2022, panic buying of IKEA kit furniture and home appliances occurred in Russia due to the company's decision to close their 17 Russian stores in light of the 2022 Russian invasion of Ukraine. Extensive queues were reported in IKEA's Moscow and  Saint Petersburg stores, and customers attempted to enter from the exit doors when entrance doors were closed.

COVID-19 pandemic 

Panic buying became a major international phenomenon in February and March 2020 during the early onset of the COVID-19 pandemic, and continued in smaller, more localized waves throughout during sporadic lockdowns across the world. Stores around the world were depleted of items such as face masks, food, bottled water, milk, toilet paper, hand sanitizer, rubbing alcohol, antibacterial wipes and painkillers. As a result, many retailers rationed the sale of these items. Online retailers eBay and Amazon began to pull certain items listed for sale by third parties such as toilet paper, face masks, pasta, canned vegetables, hand sanitizer and antibacterial wipes over price gouging concerns. As a result, Amazon restricted the sale of these items and others (such as thermometers and ventilators) to healthcare professionals and government agencies.  Additionally, panic renting of self-storage units took place during the onset of the pandemic. The massive buyouts of toilet paper caused bewilderment and confusion from the public. Images of empty shelves of toilet paper were shared on social media in many countries around the world, e.g. Australia, United States, the United Kingdom, Canada, Singapore, Hong Kong and Japan. In Australia, two women were charged over a physical altercation over toilet paper at a supermarket. The severity of the panic buying drew criticism; particularly from Prime Minister of Australia Scott Morrison, calling for Australians to "stop it". Research on this specific social phenomenon of toilet paper hoarding suggested that social media had played a crucial role in stimulating mass-anxiety and panic. Social media research found that many people posting about toilet paper panic buying were negative, either expressing anger or frustration over the frantic situation. This high amount of negative viral posts could act as an emotional trigger of anxiety and panic, spontaneously spreading fear and fueling psychological reactions in midst of the crisis. It may have triggered a snowball effect in the public, encouraged by the images and videos of empty shelves and people fighting over toilet rolls.

Gallery

See also

 Panic selling
 Revenge buying
 Stock market crash
 Economic bubble
 Mass hysteria
 Hoarding
 Panic room

References

Financial problems
Investment
Consumer behaviour
Scarcity